The Sycamore class were three river buoy tenders of the United States Coast Guard, commissioned in 1941 and 1943. Primarily designed to maintain navigational aids, they also conducted flood relief, search and rescue, and law enforcement operations, as well as pleasure boat safety inspections.

Ships

References

Ships of the United States Coast Guard